Eva Irene Probst (21 April 1930 – 19 November 2018) was a German actress.

Biography 
Born in Berlin-Kreuzberg, Probst was married to Austrian actor Gerhard Riedmann from 1954-60. In the 1950s, she starred in romantic comedy films and Heimatfilme. From its inception in 1992 until the following year, she played Jessica Naumann in the German soap opera, Gute Zeiten, schlechte Zeiten.

Probst died on 25 November 2018 at the age of 88 in a Berlin retirement home.

Selected filmography
 Only One Night (1950)
 Stips (1951)
 I Lost My Heart in Heidelberg (1952)
 Prosecutor Corda (1953) 
 The Bird Seller (1953)
 Son Without a Home (1955)
 The Major and the Bulls (1955)
 Three Days Confined to Barracks (1955)
 As Long as the Roses Bloom (1956)

References

1930 births
2018 deaths
Actresses from Berlin
German film actresses
German soap opera actresses
20th-century German actresses